Singarayakonda railway station (station code:SKM), provides rail connectivity to Singarayakonda in Prakasam district of the Indian state of Andhra Pradesh. It is administered under Vijayawada railway division of South Coast Railway zone.

Classification 
In terms of earnings and outward passengers handled, Singarayakonda is categorized as a Non-Suburban Grade-5 (NSG-5) railway station. Based on the re–categorization of Indian Railway stations for the period of 2017–18 and 2022–23, an NSG–5 category station earns between – crore and handles  passengers.

References 

Railway stations in Prakasam district
Vijayawada railway division
Railway stations in India opened in 1899